Rajya Sabha elections were held in 1970, to elect members of the Rajya Sabha, Indian Parliament's upper chamber.

Elections
Elections were held in 1970 to elect members from various states.
The list is incomplete.

Members elected
The following members are elected in the elections held in 1970. They are members for the term 1970-76 and retire in year 1976, except in case of the resignation or death before the term.

State - Member - Party

Bye-elections
The following bye elections were held in the year 1970.

State - Member - Party

 Kerala - H A Schamnad - ML ( ele  05/02/1970 term till 1973 ) d of Kesavan Thazhava
 Mysore - M Sherkhan - INC ( ele  30/03/1970 term till 1972 )
 Haryana - Sultan Singh - INC ( ele  31/03/1970 term till 1974 )
 Nominated - M N Kaul - NOM ( ele  03/04/1970 term till 1972 )
 Kerala - N K Krishnan - CPI ( ele  10/11/1970 term till 1974 )
 Bihar - Pratibha Singh - INC ( ele  31/12/1970 term till 1976 )
 Uttar Pradesh - Shiv Swaroop Singh - INC ( ele  31/12/1970 term till 1972 )

References

1970 elections in India
1970